Heathrow Airport, called London Airport until 1966 and now known as London Heathrow , is the main international airport serving London, England. It is the largest of the six international airports in the London airport system (the others being Gatwick, City, Luton, Stansted and Southend). The airport is owned and operated by Heathrow Airport Holdings. In 2021, it was the seventh-busiest airport in the world by international passenger traffic and eighth-busiest in Europe by total passenger traffic.

Heathrow was founded as a small airfield in 1929 but was developed into a much larger airport after World War II. It was gradually expanded over 75 years and now has two parallel east-west runways, four operational passenger terminals and one cargo terminal. The airport is the primary hub for British Airways and Virgin Atlantic.

Location

Heathrow falls entirely within the boundaries of the London Borough of Hillingdon, and under the Twickenham postcode area, with the postcode TW6. It is surrounded by the villages of Sipson, Harlington, Harmondsworth, and Longford to the north and the neighbourhoods of Cranford and Hatton to the east. To the south lie Feltham, Bedfont and Stanwell while to the west Heathrow is separated from Slough, Horton and Windsor in Berkshire by the M25 motorway. The airport is located within the Hayes and Harlington parliamentary constituency.

As the airport is located west of London and as its runways run east-west, an aircraft‘s landing approach is usually directly over the conurbation of London when the wind is from the south-west — as it is, most of the time.

History

Heathrow Airport began in 1929 as a small airfield (Great West Aerodrome) on land southeast of the hamlet of Heathrow from which the airport takes its name. At that time the land consisted of farms, market gardens and orchards; there was a "Heathrow Farm" approximately where the modern Terminal 2 is situated, a "Heathrow Hall" and a "Heathrow House." This hamlet was largely along a country lane (Heathrow Road), which ran roughly along the east and south edges of the present central terminals area.

Development of the whole Heathrow area as a much larger airport began in 1944 during World War II. It was principally used for long-distance military aircraft bound for the Far East.  By the time the airfield was complete, World War II had ended, and the UK Government continued to develop the site as a civil airport. The airport was opened on 25 March 1946 as London Airport and was renamed Heathrow Airport in 1966. The design for the airport was by Sir Frederick Gibberd.  He set out the original terminals and central-area buildings, including the original control tower and the multi-faith Chapel of St George's.

Operations

Facilities

Heathrow Airport is used by over 80 airlines flying to 185 destinations in 84 countries. The airport is the primary hub of British Airways and is a base for Virgin Atlantic. It has four passenger terminals (numbered 2 to 5) and a cargo terminal. Of Heathrow's 78 million passengers in 2017, 94% were travelling into or out of the country; the remaining 6% were bound for, or arriving from, places within the UK. The busiest single destination in passenger numbers is New York, with over three million passengers flying between Heathrow and JFK Airport in 2013.

In the 1950s, Heathrow had six runways, arranged in three pairs at different angles in the shape of a hexagram with the permanent passenger terminal in the middle and the older terminal along the north edge of the field; two of its runways would always be within 30° of the wind direction. As the required length for runways has grown, Heathrow now has only two parallel runways running east-west. These are extended versions of the two east-west runways from the original hexagram. From the air, almost all of the original runways can still be seen, incorporated into the present system of taxiways. North of the northern runway and the former taxiway and aprons, now the site of extensive car parks, is the entrance to the access tunnel and the site of Heathrow's unofficial "gate guardian". For many years the home of a 40% scale model of a British Airways Concorde, G-CONC; the site has been occupied by a model of an Emirates Airbus A380 since 2008.

Heathrow Airport has Anglican, Catholic, Free Church, Hindu, Jewish, Muslim and Sikh chaplains. There is a multi-faith prayer room and counselling room in each terminal, in addition to St. George's Interdenominational Chapel in an underground vault adjacent to the old control tower, where Christian services take place. The chaplains organise and lead prayers at certain times in the prayer room.

The airport has its resident press corps, consisting of six photographers and one TV crew, serving all the major newspapers and television stations around the world.

Most of Heathrow's internal roads’ names are coded by their first letter: N in the north (e.g. Newall Road), E in the east (e.g. Elmdon Road), S in the south (e.g. Stratford Road), W in the west (e.g. Walrus Road), C in the centre (e.g. Camborne Road).

Flight movements
Aircraft destined for Heathrow are usually routed to one of four holding points.

Considerable use is made of continuous descent approach techniques to minimise the environmental effects of incoming aircraft, particularly at night. Once an aircraft is established on its final approach, control is handed over to Heathrow Tower.

When runway alternation was introduced, aircraft generated significantly more noise on departure than when landing, so a preference for westerly operations during daylight was introduced, which continues to this day. In this mode, aircraft take off towards the west and land from the east over London, thereby minimising the impact of noise on the most densely populated areas. Heathrow's two runways generally operate in segregated mode, whereby landings are allocated to one runway and takeoffs to the other. To further reduce noise nuisance, the use of runways 27R and 27L is swapped at 15:00 each day if the wind is from the west. When landings are easterly there is no alternation; 09L remains the landing runway and 09R the takeoff runway due to the legacy of the now rescinded Cranford Agreement, pending taxiway works to allow the roles to be reversed. Occasionally, landings are allowed on the nominated departure runway, to help reduce airborne delays and to position landing aircraft closer to their terminal, reducing taxi times.

Night-time flights at Heathrow are subject to restrictions. Between 23:00 and 04:00, the noisiest aircraft (rated QC/8 and QC/16) cannot be scheduled for operation. Also, during the night quota period (23:30–06:00) there are four limits:
 A limit on the number of flights allowed.
 A Quota Count system which limits the total amount of noise permitted, but allows operators to choose to operate fewer noisy aircraft or a greater number of quieter planes.
 QC/4 aircraft cannot be scheduled for operation.
 A voluntary agreement with the airlines that no early-morning arrivals will be scheduled to land before 04:30.

A trial of "noise-relief zones" ran from December 2012 to March 2013, which concentrated approach flight paths into defined areas compared with the existing paths which were spread out. The zones used alternated weekly, meaning residents in the "no-fly" areas received respite from aircraft noise for set periods. However, it was concluded that some residents in other areas experienced more noise as a consequence of the trial and that it should therefore not be taken forward in its current form. Heathrow received more than 25,000 noise complaints in just three months over the summer of 2016, but around half were made by the same ten people.

In 2017, Heathrow introduced "Fly Quiet & Green", a quarterly published league table (currently suspended due to the Covid pandemic) that awards points to the 50 busiest airlines at the airport, ostensibly based on their performance relative to each other across a range of seven environmental benchmarks, such as  emissions. Heathrow has acknowledged, but not attempted to refute, criticism over discrepancies and a lack of transparency over the way in which the figures are calculated. The airport has always refused to publish a breakdown showing how many "Fly Quiet points" each performance benchmark has contributed towards the total score it awards to an airline, thereby putting obstacles in the way of any independent auditing of the published results. Among other criticisms of the league table are the unexplained omission of some of the poorer performers among the 50 busiest airlines and the emphasis on relative rather than absolute performance, so an airline could well improve its "Fly Quiet" score quarter-on-quarter even if its environmental performance had in fact worsened over the period.

Due to the COVID-19 pandemic Heathrow has seen a big increase in cargo-only flights, not only by already established carriers at the airport operating cargo-only flights using passenger aircraft, but also several cargo-only airlines.

Arrival stacks

Inbound aircraft to London Heathrow Airport typically follow one of several Standard Arrival Routes (STARs). The STARs each terminate at one of four different RNAV waypoints, and these also define four "stacks" where aircraft can be held, if necessary until they are cleared to begin their approach to land. Stacks are sections of airspace where inbound aircraft will normally use the pattern closest to their arrival route. They can be visualised as helter skelters in the sky. Each stack descends in 1000  ft (300 m) intervals from 16,000  ft (4,000m) down to 8000  ft (2,100m). Aircraft hold between 7,000 feet and 15,000 feet at 1,000-foot intervals. If these holds become full, aircraft are held at more distant points before being cleared onward to one of the four main holds.

The following four stacks are currently in place:
 The Bovingdon stack (BNN) is for arrivals from the northwest. It extends above the village of Bovingdon and the town of Chesham, and uses the RNAV waypoint BNN, which is situated on the former RAF Bovingdon airfield.
 The Biggin Hill stack (BIG) on the southeast edge of Greater London is for arrivals from the southeast. It uses the RNAV waypoint BIG, which is situated on London Biggin Hill Airport.
 The Lambourne stack (LAM) in Essex is for arrivals from the northeast. It uses the RNAV waypoint LAM, which is situated adjacent to Stapleford Aerodrome.
 The Ockham stack (OCK) in Surrey is for arrivals from the southwest. It uses the RNAV waypoint OCK, which is situated on the former Wisley Airfield.

Third runway
In September 2012, the Government of the United Kingdom established the Airports Commission, an independent commission chaired by Sir Howard Davies to examine various options for increasing capacity at UK airports. In July 2015, the commission backed a third runway at Heathrow, which the government approved in October 2016. However, the England and Wales Court of Appeal rejected this plan for a third runway at Heathrow, on the basis that the government failed to consider climate change and the environmental impact of aviation. On 16 December 2020, the UK Supreme Court lifted the ban on the third runway expansion, allowing the construction plan to go ahead.

Regulation

Until it was required to sell Gatwick and Stansted Airports, Heathrow Airport Holdings held a dominant position in the London aviation market and has been heavily regulated by the Civil Aviation Authority (CAA) as to how much it can charge airlines to land. The annual increase in landing charge per passenger was capped at inflation minus 3% until 1 April 2003. From 2003 to 2007 charges increased by inflation plus 6.5% per year, taking the fee to £9.28 per passenger in 2007. In March 2008, the CAA announced that the charge would be allowed to increase by 23.5% to £12.80 from 1 April 2008 and by inflation plus 7.5% for each of the following four years. In April 2013, the CAA announced a proposal for Heathrow to charge fees calculated by inflation minus 1.3%, continuing until 2019. Whilst the charges for landing at Heathrow are determined by the CAA and Heathrow Airport Holdings, the allocation of landing slots to airlines is carried out by Airport Co-ordination Limited (ACL).

Until 2008, air traffic between Heathrow and the United States was strictly governed by the countries' bilateral Bermuda II treaty. The treaty originally allowed only British Airways, Pan Am and TWA to fly from Heathrow to the US. In 1991, Pan Am and TWA sold their rights to United Airlines and American Airlines respectively, while Virgin Atlantic was added to the list of airlines allowed to operate on these routes. The Bermuda bilateral agreement conflicted with the Right of the Establishment of the United Kingdom concerning its EU membership, and as a consequence, the UK was ordered to drop the agreement in 2004. A new "open skies" agreement was signed by the United States and the European Union on 30 April 2007 and came into effect on 30 March 2008. Shortly afterwards, additional US airlines, including Northwest Airlines, Continental Airlines, US Airways and Delta Air Lines started services to Heathrow.

The airport was criticised in 2007 for overcrowding and delays; according to Heathrow Airport Holdings, Heathrow's facilities were originally designed to accommodate 55 million passengers annually. The number of passengers using the airport reached a record 70 million in 2012. In 2007 the airport was voted the world's least favourite, alongside Chicago O'Hare, in a TripAdvisor survey. However, the opening of Terminal 5 in 2008 has relieved some pressure on terminal facilities, increasing the airport's terminal capacity to 90  million passengers per year. A tie-up is also in place with McLaren Applied Technologies to optimise the general procedure, reducing delays and pollution.

With only two runways, operating at over 98% of their capacity, Heathrow has little room for more flights, although the  use of larger aircraft such as the Airbus A380 has allowed some increase in passenger numbers. It is difficult for existing airlines to obtain landing slots to enable them to increase their services from the airport, or for new airlines to start operations. To increase the number of flights, Heathrow Airport Holdings has proposed using the existing two runways in 'mixed mode' whereby aircraft would be allowed to take off and land on the same runway. This would increase the airport's capacity from its current 480,000 movements per year to as many as 550,000 according to British Airways CEO Willie Walsh. Heathrow Airport Holdings has also proposed building a third runway to the north of the airport, which would significantly increase traffic capacity.

Security
Policing of the airport is the responsibility of the aviation security, a unit of the Metropolitan Police, although the British Army, including armoured vehicles of the Household Cavalry, has occasionally been deployed at the airport during periods of heightened security. Full body scanners are now used at the airport, and passengers who refuse to use them are required to submit to a hand search in a private room. The scanners display passengers' bodies as cartoon figures, with indicators showing where concealed items may be.

For many decades Heathrow had a reputation for theft from baggage by baggage handlers. This led to the airport being nicknamed "Thiefrow", with periodic arrests of baggage handlers. 

Following the widespread disruption caused by reports of drone sightings at Gatwick Airport, and a subsequent incident at Heathrow, a drone-detection system was installed airport-wide to attempt to combat disruption caused by the illegal use of drones.

Terminals
Heathrow Airport currently consists of four operational passenger terminal buildings:

Terminal 2 

The airport's newest terminal, officially known as the Queen's Terminal, was opened on 4 June 2014 and has 24 gates. Designed by Spanish architect Luis Vidal, it was built on the site that had been occupied by the original Terminal 2 and the Queens Building. The main complex was completed in November 2013 and underwent six months of testing before opening to passengers. It includes a satellite pier (T2B), a 1,340-space car park, and a cooling station to generate chilled water. There are 52 shops and 17 bars and restaurants.

The airlines moved from their original locations over six months, with only 10% of flights operating from there in the first six weeks (United Airlines' transatlantic flights) to avoid the opening problems seen at Terminal 5. On 4 June 2014, United Airlines became the first airline to move into Terminal 2 from Terminals 1 and 4 followed by All Nippon Airways, Air Canada and Air China from Terminal 3. Air New Zealand, Asiana Airlines, Croatia Airlines, LOT Polish Airlines, South African Airways, and TAP Air Portugal moved in on 22 October 2014.

Most flights from Terminal 2 are coming from northern Europe or west Europe. It is primarily used airlines from Star Alliance who fly from Heathrow (consolidating the airlines under Star Alliance's co-location policy "Move Under One Roof"). The terminal is also used by SkyTeam member China Airlines along with a few non-aligned airlines. Terminal 2 is one of the two terminals that operate UK and Irish domestic flights. 

The original Terminal 2 opened as the Europa Building in 1955 and was the airport's oldest terminal. In its final years, it accommodated up to 8 million. A total of 316 million passengers passed through the terminal in its lifetime. The building was demolished in 2010, along with the Queens Building which had housed airline company offices.

Terminal 3 

Terminal 3 opened as the Oceanic Terminal on 13 November 1961 to handle flight departures for long-haul routes for foreign carriers to the United States, Asia and other Far Eastern destinations. At this time the airport had a direct helicopter service to Central London from the gardens on the roof of the terminal building. Renamed Terminal 3 in 1968, it was expanded in 1970 with the addition of an arrivals building. Other facilities added included the UK's first moving walkways. In 2006, the new £105 million Pier 6 was completed to accommodate the Airbus A380 superjumbo; Emirates and Qantas operate regular flights from Terminal 3 using the Airbus A380.

Redevelopment of Terminal 3's forecourt by the addition of a new four-lane drop-off area and a large pedestrianised plaza, complete with a canopy to the front of the terminal building, was completed in 2007. These improvements were intended to improve passengers' experience, reduce traffic congestion and improve security. As part of this project, Virgin Atlantic was assigned its dedicated check-in area, known as 'Zone A', which features a large sculpture and atrium.

Most flights from Terminal 3 are long haul flights from North America, Asia and other foreign countries other than Europe. Terminal 3 is home to Oneworld members (with the exception of Malaysia Airlines, Qatar Airways and Royal Air Maroc, all of which use Terminal 4), SkyTeam members Aeroméxico, Air France, Delta Air Lines, KLM and Middle East Airlines, and several long haul unaffiliated carriers.

Terminal 4 

Opened in 1986, Terminal 4 has 22 gates and is situated to the south of the southern runway next to the cargo terminal and is connected to Terminals 2 and 3 by the Heathrow Cargo Tunnel. It has undergone a £200m upgrade to enable it to accommodate 45 airlines with an upgraded forecourt to reduce traffic congestion and improve security. Most flights that go to Terminal 4 are flights coming from East Europe, Central Asia, North Africa and the Middle East as well as a few flights to Europe. An extended check-in area with renovated piers and departure lounges and a new baggage system were installed, and four new stands were built to accommodate the Airbus A380; Qatar Airways operates regular A380 flights. Etihad Airways and Malaysia Airlines operate regular A350 flights. China Southern Airlines, El Al,  Etihad Airways,  Gulf Air,  and Vietnam Airlines operate regular Boeing 787 flights.

Terminal 5 

Terminal 5 lies between the northern and southern runways at the western end of the Heathrow site and was opened by Queen Elizabeth II on 14 March 2008, some 19 years after its inception. It opened to the public on 27 March 2008, and British Airways and its partner company Iberia have exclusive use of this terminal, which has 50 gates, including 3 hardstands. The first passenger to enter Terminal 5 was a UK ex-pat from Kenya who passed through security at 04:30 on the day. He was presented with a boarding pass by British Airways CEO Willie Walsh for the first departing flight, BA302 to Paris. During the two weeks after its opening, operations were disrupted by problems with the terminal's IT systems, coupled with insufficient testing and staff training, which caused over 500 flights to be cancelled. Terminal 5 is exclusively used by British Airways as its global hub. However, because of the merger, between 25 March 2012 and 12 July 2022, Iberia's operations at Heathrow were moved to the terminal, making it the home of International Airlines Group.  On 12 July 2022, Iberia's flight operations were moved back to Terminal 3. On 7 July 2020, American moved to Terminal 5, to allow for easier connections from American's transatlantic flights to British Airways flights during the pandemic. However, all the American flights, except JFK, have returned to Terminal 3. China Southern Airlines used Terminal 5 due to the pandemic until it was relocated to Terminal 4 in November 2022.

Built for £4.3 billion, the terminal consists of a four-story main terminal building (Concourse A) and two satellite buildings linked to the main terminal by an underground people mover transit system. Concourse A is dedicated to British Airways's narrowbody fleet for flights around the UK and the rest of Europe, the first satellite (Concourse B) includes dedicated stands for BA and Iberia's widebody fleet except for the Airbus A380, and the second satellite (Concourse C), includes 7 dedicated aircraft stands for the A380. It became fully operational on 1 June 2011. Terminal 5 was voted Skytrax World's Best Airport Terminal 2014 in the Annual World Airport Awards.

It has 60 aircraft stands and capacity for 30 million passengers annually as well as more than 100 shops and restaurants. It is also home to British Airways' Flagship lounge, the Concorde Room, alongside four further British Airways branded lounges. One of those lounges is the British Airways Arrivals Lounge which is located land-side.

A further building, designated Concourse D and of similar size to Concourse C, may yet be built to the east of the existing site, providing up to another 16 stands. Following British Airways' merger with Iberia, this may become a priority since the combined business will require accommodation at Heathrow under one roof to maximise the cost savings envisaged under the deal. A proposal for Concourse D was featured in Heathrow's most recent capital investment plan.

The transport network around the airport has been extended to cope with the increase in passenger numbers. New branches of both the Heathrow Express and the Underground's Piccadilly line serve a new shared Heathrow Terminal 5 station. A dedicated motorway spur links the terminal to the M25 (between junctions 14 and 15). The terminal has a 3,800 spaces multi-storey car park. A more distant long-stay car park for business passengers is connected to the terminal by a personal rapid transit system, the Heathrow Pod, which became operational in the spring of 2011. Within the terminal complex, an automated people mover (APM) system, known as the Transit, is used to transport passengers between the satellite buildings.

Terminal assignments
As of July 2022, Heathrow's four passenger terminals are assigned as follows:

Following the opening of Terminal 5 in March 2008, a complex programme of terminal moves was implemented. This saw many airlines move to be grouped in terminals by airline alliance as far as possible.

Following the opening of Phase 1 of the new Terminal 2 in June 2014, all Star Alliance member airlines (with the exception of new member Air India which moved in early 2017) along with Aer Lingus and Germanwings relocated to Terminal 2 in a phased process completed on 22 October 2014. Additionally, by 30 June 2015 all airlines left Terminal 1 in preparation for its demolition to make room for the construction of Phase 2 of Terminal 2. Some other airlines made further minor moves at a later point, e.g. Delta Air Lines merging all departures in Terminal 3 instead of a split between Terminals 3 and 4.

Terminal usage during COVID-19 pandemic 
Heathrow Airport has four terminals with a total of 115 gates, 66 of which can support wide-body aircraft and 24 gates that can support an Airbus A380. Due to the COVID-19 pandemic, Heathrow's services were sharply reduced. It announced that as of 6 April 2020, the airport would be transitioning to single-runway operations and that it would be temporarily closing Terminals 3 and 4, moving all remaining flights into Terminals 2 or 5. Dual runway operations were restored in August 2020. Heathrow returned to single-runway operations on 9 November 2020. On 11 December 2020, Heathrow announced Terminal 4 would be shut until the end of 2021. Terminal 3 was reopened for use by Virgin Atlantic and Delta on 15 July 2021, and Terminal 4 was reopened on 14 June 2022.

Former Terminal 1

Terminal 1 opened in 1968 and was inaugurated by Queen Elizabeth II in April 1969. Terminal 1 was the Heathrow base for British Airways' (BA) domestic and European network and a few of its long haul routes before Terminal 5 opened. The acquisition of British Midland International (BMI) in 2012 by BA's owner International Airlines Group meant British Airways took over BMI's short-haul and medium-haul destinations from the terminal. Terminal 1 was also the main base for most Star Alliance members though some were also based at Terminal 3.

Terminal 1 closed at the end of June 2015, the site is now being used to extend Terminal 2 which opened in June 2014. A number of the newer gates used by Terminal 1 were built as part of the Terminal 2 development and are being retained. The last tenants along with British Airways were El Al, Icelandair (moved to Terminal 2 25 March 2015) and LATAM Brasil (the third to move in to Terminal 3 on 27 May 2015). British Airways was the last operator in Terminal 1. Two flights of this carrier, one departing to Hanover and one arriving from Baku, marked the terminal closure on 29 June 2015. British Airways operations have been relocated to Terminals 3 and 5.

Airlines and destinations

Passenger

The following airlines operate regularly scheduled passenger flights at London Heathrow Airport:

Cargo

Traffic and statistics

Overview

When ranked by passenger traffic, Heathrow is the sixth busiest internationally, behind Hartsfield–Jackson Atlanta International Airport, Beijing Capital International Airport, Dubai International Airport, Chicago's O'Hare International Airport, and Tokyo Haneda Airport, for the 12 months ending December 2015. London Heathrow Airport was noted as the best-connected airport globally in 2019 according to the OAG's Megahubs Index with a connectivity score of 317. Dominant carrier British Airways was recorded as holding a 51% share of flights at the hub. 

In 2015, Heathrow was the busiest airport in Europe in total passenger traffic, with 14% more passengers than Paris–Charles de Gaulle Airport and 22% more than Istanbul Atatürk Airport. Heathrow was the fourth busiest European airport by cargo traffic in 2013, after Frankfurt Airport, Paris Charles de Gaulle and Amsterdam Airport Schiphol.

In 2020, Heathrow's passenger numbers dropped sharply by over 72%, (a decrease of 58 million travellers compared to 2019), due to the impact caused by restrictions and/or bans on travel caused by the global COVID-19 pandemic.

Annual traffic statistics

Overview

In table

Busiest routes
Heathrow Airport processed 80,884,310 passengers in 2019, but only 22,109,723 in 2020 and 19,393,145 in 2021, due to the COVID-19 pandemic. In 2021, Dubai International Airport  was the most popular route with 808,620 passengers. The table below shows the 10 busiest international routes at the airport in 2021.

Other facilities

The head office of Heathrow Airport Holdings (formerly BAA Limited) is located in the Compass Centre by Heathrow's northern runway, a building that previously served as a British Airways flight crew centre. The World Business Centre Heathrow consists of three buildings. 1 World Business Centre houses offices of Heathrow Airport Holdings, Heathrow Airport itself, and Scandinavian Airlines. Previously International Airlines Group had its head office in 2 World Business Centre.

At one time the British Airways head office was located within Heathrow Airport at Speedbird House before the completion of Waterside, the current BA head office in Harmondsworth, in June 1998.

To the north of the airfield lies the Northern Perimeter Road, along which most of Heathrow's car rental agencies are based, and Bath Road, which runs parallel to it, but outside the airport campus. This is nicknamed "The Strip" by locals, because of its continuous line of airport hotels.

Transport

Public transport

Train

 Heathrow Express: a non-stop service direct to London Paddington; trains leave every 15 minutes for the 15-minute journey (21 minutes to and from Terminal 5). Trains depart from Heathrow Terminal 5 station or Heathrow Central station (Terminals 2 & 3). Free transfer service operates between Terminal 4 and Heathrow Central to connect with services from London and Terminal 5.
 Elizabeth line: a stopping service to Abbey Wood via Paddington and central London – trains leave every 30 minutes. Calls at Hayes & Harlington for connecting trains to Reading. It will also serve the line to Shenfield from 2023.
 London Underground (Piccadilly line): four stations serve the airport: Terminal 2 & 3, Terminal 4 and Terminal 5 serve the passenger terminals; Hatton Cross serves the maintenance areas. The usual journey time from Heathrow Central to Central London is around 40–50 minutes.

Bus and coach
Many bus and coach services operate from the large Heathrow Central bus station, which serves Terminal 2 and Terminal 3. Services also operate from the bus stations located at Terminal 4 and Terminal 5.

Inter-terminal transport
Terminals 2 and 3 are within walking distance of each other. Transfers from Terminals 2 and 3 to Terminal 4 and 5 are provided by Elizabeth line and Heathrow Express trains and the London Underground Piccadilly line. Direct transfer between Terminals 4 and 5 is provided by London Buses routes 482 and 490.

Transit passengers remaining airside are provided with free dedicated transfer buses between terminals.

The Heathrow Pod personal rapid transit system shuttles passengers between Terminal 5 and the business car park using 21 small, driverless transportation pods. The pods are battery-powered and run on-demand on a four-kilometre track, each able to carry up to four adults, two children, and their luggage. Plans exist to extend the Pod system to connect Terminals 2 and 3 to remote car parks.

An underground automated people mover system known as the Transit operates within Terminal 5, linking the main terminal with the satellite Terminals 5B and 5C. The Transit operates entirely airside using Bombardier Innovia APM 200 people mover vehicles.

Hotel access
The Hotel Hoppa bus network connects all terminals to major hotels in the area.

Taxi
Taxis are available at all terminals.

Car

Heathrow is accessible via the nearby M4 motorway or A4 road (Terminals 2–3), the M25 motorway (Terminals 4 and 5) and the A30 road (Terminal 4). There are drop-off and pick-up areas at all terminals and short- and long-stay multi-storey car parks. All the Heathrow forecourts are drop-off only. There are further car parks, not run by Heathrow Airport Holdings, just outside the airport: the most recognisable is the National Car Parks facility, although there are many other options; these car parks are connected to the terminals by shuttle buses.

Four parallel tunnels under the northern runway connect the M4 Heathrow spur and the A4 road to Terminals 2–3. The two larger tunnels are each two lanes wide and are used for motorised traffic. The two smaller tunnels were originally reserved for pedestrians and bicycles; to increase traffic capacity the cycle lanes have been modified to each take a single lane of cars, although bicycles still have priority over cars. Pedestrian access to the smaller tunnels has been discontinued, with the free bus services being used instead.

Bicycle
There are (mainly off-road) bicycle routes to some of the terminals. Free bicycle parking places are available in car parks 1 and 1A, at Terminal 4, and to the North and South of Terminal 5's Interchange Plaza. Cycling is not currently allowed through the main tunnel to access the central area and Terminals 2 and 3.

Incidents and accidents
 On 3 March 1948, Sabena Douglas DC-3 OO-AWH crashed in fog. Three crew and 19 of the 22 passengers on board died.
 On 31 October 1950, BEA Vickers Viking G-AHPN crashed at Heathrow after hitting the runway during a go-around. Three crew and 25 passengers died.
 On 16 January 1955, a BEA Vickers Viscount (registered as G-AMOK) crashed into barriers whilst taking off in the fog from a disused runway strip parallel to the desired runway. There were two injuries.
 On 22 June 1955, a BOAC de Havilland Dove (registration: G-ALTM) crashed just short of the runway during a filming flight when the pilot shut down the incorrect engine. There were no casualties.
 On 1 October 1956, XA897, an Avro Vulcan strategic bomber of the Royal Air Force, crashed at Heathrow after an approach in bad weather. The Vulcan was the first to be delivered to the RAF and was returning from a demonstration flight to Australia and New Zealand. The pilot and co-pilot ejected and survived, but the four other occupants were killed.
 On 7 January 1960, Vickers Viscount G-AOHU of BEA was damaged beyond economic repair when the nose wheel collapsed on landing. A fire then developed and burnt out the fuselage. There were no casualties among the 59 people on board.
 On 27 October 1965, BEA Vickers Vanguard G-APEE, flying from Edinburgh, crashed on Runway 28R while attempting to land in poor visibility. All 30 passengers and six crew on board died.
 On 8 April 1968, BOAC Flight 712 Boeing 707 G-ARWE, departing for Australia via Singapore, suffered an engine fire just after take-off. The engine fell from the wing into a nearby gravel pit in Staines, before the plane managed to perform an emergency landing with the wing on fire. However, the plane was consumed by fire once on the ground. Five people – four passengers and a flight attendant – died, while 122 survived. The flight attendant, Barbara Harrison, who helped with the evacuation, was posthumously awarded the George Cross.
 On 3 July 1968, the port flap operating rod of G-AMAD, an Airspeed Ambassador operated by BKS Air Transport failed due to fatigue, thereby allowing the port flaps to retract. This resulted in a rolling movement to the port which could not be controlled during the approach, causing the aircraft to contact the grass and swerve towards the terminal building. It hit two parked British European Airways Hawker Siddeley Trident aircraft, burst into flames and came to rest against the ground floor of the terminal building. Six of the eight crew died, as did eight horses on board. Trident G-ARPT was written off, and Trident G-ARPI was badly damaged, but subsequently repaired, only to be lost in the Staines crash in 1972.
 On 18 June 1972, Trident G-ARPI, operating as BEA548, crashed in a field close to the Crooked Billet Public House, Staines, two minutes after taking off. All 118 passengers and crew on board died.
 On 5 November 1997, an Airbus 340-300 (G-VSKY) operated by Virgin Atlantic made an emergency landing from Los Angeles after trying to shake free the main landing gear. It failed to do so. The plane landed but the undersides of engines 1, 2, and 4 were damaged. The plane broke runway lights as well as causing damage to the runway and the right landing gear was torn off the plane. Seven people sustained minor injuries in the evacuation but no more injuries were reported.
 On 17 January 2008, a British Airways Boeing 777-236ER, G-YMMM, operating flight BA038 from Beijing, crash-landed at Heathrow. The aircraft landed on grass short of the south runway, then slid to the edge of the runway and stopped on the threshold, leading to 18 minor injuries. The aircraft was later found to have suffered a loss of thrust caused by fuel icing.
 On 28 September 2022, there was a ground collision involving a Korean Air Boeing 777 that was about to take off to Seoul, and an Icelandair Boeing 757 which had landed from Reykjavik. The 777 aborted its takeoff and no injuries were reported, but the aircraft suffered minor damage.

Terrorism and security incidents
 On 8 June 1968, James Earl Ray, the man convicted of the 4 April 1968 assassination of Martin Luther King Jr., was captured and arrested at Heathrow Airport while attempting to leave the United Kingdom for Rhodesia (now Zimbabwe) on a false Canadian passport.
 On 6 September 1970, El Al Flight 219 experienced an attempted hijack by two PFLP members. One hijacker was killed and the other was subdued as the plane made an emergency landing at Heathrow Airport.
 On 19 May 1974, the IRA planted a series of bombs in the Terminal 1 car park. Two people were injured by the explosions.
 On 26 November 1983, the Brink's-Mat robbery occurred, in which 6,800 gold bars worth nearly £26,000,000 were taken from a vault near Heathrow. Only a small amount of the gold was recovered and only two men were convicted of the crime.
 On 17 April 1986, semtex explosives were found in the bag of a pregnant Irishwoman attempting to board an El Al flight. The explosives had been given to her by her Jordanian boyfriend and the father of her unborn child Nizar Hindawi. The incident became known as the Hindawi Affair.
On 21 December 1988, Pan Am Flight 103 exploded mid-air over the town of Lockerbie, killing all 259 onboard and eleven people on the ground. The flight originated from Frankfurt as a feeder flight with a change of aircraft at Heathrow and was on its transatlantic leg to New York's JFK airport at the time of the incident. An unaccompanied suitcase containing a boombox radio/cassette player which housed the explosive was checked in at Malta and forwarded as interline baggage for this flight at Frankfurt, wherein it made its way to the transatlantic leg.
 In 1994, over six days, Heathrow was targeted three times (8, 10, and 13 March) by the IRA, which fired 12 mortars. Heathrow was a symbolic target due to its importance to the UK economy, and much disruption was caused when areas of the airport were closed over the period. The gravity of the incident was heightened because the Queen was being flown back to Heathrow by the RAF on 10 March.
 In March 2002, thieves stole US$3,000,000 that had arrived on a South African Airways flight. Just a few weeks earlier, a similar amount of money was stolen from a British Airways flight that arrived from Bahrain.
 In February 2003, the British Army was deployed to Heathrow along with 1,000 police officers in response to intelligence reports suggesting that al-Qaeda terrorists might launch surface-to-air missile attacks at British or American airliners.
 On 17 May 2004, Scotland Yard's Flying Squad foiled an attempt by seven men to steal £40,000,000 in gold bullion and a similar quantity of cash from the Swissport warehouse at Heathrow.
 On 25 February 2008, Greenpeace activists protesting against the planned construction of a third runway managed to cross the ramp and climb atop a British Airways Airbus A320, which had just arrived from Manchester Airport. At about 09:45 GMT the protesters unveiled a "Climate Emergency – No Third Runway" banner over the aircraft's tailfin. By 11:00 GMT four arrests had been made.
 In October 2010, an Angolan national was being deported on a British Airways plane. Security guards were heavy-handed with him and they put him in a dangerous position, leading to asphyxia. He did not survive.
 On 13 July 2015, thirteen activists belonging to the climate change protest group Plane Stupid managed to break through the perimeter fence and get onto the northern runway. They chained themselves together in protest, disrupting hundreds of flights. All were eventually arrested.|
In June 2022, many protesters gathered at Heathrow and Gatwick airports to protest the UK-Rwanda deal. A flight which was supposed to carry asylum seekers from the UK to Rwanda was cancelled.

Other incidents
 On 18 December 2010, 'heavy' (9 cm, according to the Heathrow Winter Resilience Enquiry) snowfall caused the closure of the entire airport, causing one of the largest incidents at Heathrow of all time. Some 4,000 flights were cancelled over five days and 9,500 passengers spent the night at Heathrow on 18 December following the initial snowfall. The problems were caused not only by snow on the runways but also by snow and ice on the 198 parking stands which were all occupied by aircraft.
 On 12 July 2013, the ELT on an Ethiopian Airlines Boeing 787 Dreamliner parked at Heathrow airport caught fire due to a short circuit. There were no passengers aboard and no injuries.
 From 12 September 2019, the climate change campaign group, Heathrow Pause attempted to disrupt flights into and out of Heathrow Airport in London by flying drones in the airport's exclusion zone. The action was unsuccessful in disrupting flights and nineteen people were arrested.

Future expansion and plans

Runway and terminal expansion

There is a long history of expansion proposals for Heathrow since it was first designated as a civil airport. Following the cancellation of the Maplin project in 1974, a fourth terminal was proposed but expansion beyond this was ruled out. However, the Airports Inquiries of 1981–83 and the 1985 Airports Policy White Paper considered further expansion and, following a four-year-long public inquiry in 1995–99, Terminal 5 was approved. In 2003, after many studies and consultations, the Future of Air Transport White Paper was published which proposed a third runway at Heathrow, as well as a second runway at Stansted Airport. In January 2009, the Transport Secretary at the time, Geoff Hoon announced that the British government supported the expansion of Heathrow by building a third  runway and a sixth terminal building. This decision followed the 2003 white paper on the future of air transport in the UK, and a public consultation in November 2007. This was a controversial decision which met with widespread opposition because of the expected greenhouse gas emissions, impact on local communities, as well as noise and air pollution concerns.

Before the 2010 general election, the Conservative and Liberal Democrat parties announced that they would prevent the construction of any third runway or further material expansion of the airport's operating capacity. The Mayor of London, then Boris Johnson, took the position that London needs more airport capacity, favouring the construction of an entirely new airport in the Thames Estuary rather than expanding Heathrow. After the Conservative-Liberal Democrat coalition took power, it was announced that the third runway expansion was cancelled. Two years later, leading Conservatives were reported to have changed their minds on the subject.

Another proposal for expanding Heathrow's capacity was the Heathrow Hub, which aims to extend both runways to a total length of about 7,000 metres and divide them into four so that they each provide two, full-length runways, allowing simultaneous take-offs and landings while decreasing noise levels.

In July 2013, the airport submitted three new proposals for expansion to the Airports Commission, which was established to review airport capacity in the southeast of England. The Airports Commission was chaired by Sir Howard Davies. He, at the time of his appointment, was in the employ of GIC Private Limited (formerly known as Government Investment Corporation of Singapore) and a member of its International Advisory Board. GIC Private Limited was then (2012), as it remains today, one of Heathrow's principal owners. Sir Howard Davies resigned from these positions upon confirmation of his appointment to lead the Airports Commission, although it has been observed that he failed to identify these interests when invited to complete the Airports Commission's register of interests. Each of the three proposals that were to be considered by Sir Howard Davies's commission involved the construction of a third runway, either to the north, northwest or southwest of the airport.

The commission released its interim report in December 2013, shortlisting three options: the north-west third runway option at Heathrow, extending an existing runway at Heathrow, and a second runway at Gatwick Airport. After this report was published, the government confirmed that no options had been ruled out for airport expansion in the South-east and that a new runway would not be built at Heathrow before 2015. The full report was published on 1 July 2015, and backed a third, north-west, runway at Heathrow. Reaction to the report was generally adverse, particularly from London Mayor Boris Johnson. One senior Conservative told Channel 4: "Howard Davies has dumped an utter steaming pile of poo on the Prime Minister's desk." On 25 October 2016, the government confirmed that Heathrow would be allowed to build a third runway; however, a final decision would not be taken until winter of 2017/18, after consultations and government votes. The earliest opening year would be 2025.

On 5 June 2018, the UK Cabinet approved the third runway, with a full vote planned for Parliament. On 25 June 2018, the House of Commons voted, 415–119, in favour of the third runway. The bill received support from most MPs in the Conservative and Labour parties. A judicial review against the decision was launched by four London local authorities affected by the expansion—Wandsworth, Richmond, Hillingdon and Hammersmith and Fulham—in partnership with Greenpeace and London mayor Sadiq Khan. Khan previously stated he would take legal action if it were passed by Parliament.

In February 2020, the Court of Appeal ruled that the plans for a third runway were illegal since they did not adequately take into account the government's commitments to the Paris climate agreement. However, this ruling was later overturned by the Supreme Court in December 2020.

New transport proposals

Currently, all rail connections with Heathrow airport run along an east-west alignment to and from central London, and a number of schemes have been proposed over the years to develop new rail transport links with other parts of London and with stations outside the city. This mainline rail service is due to be extended to central London and Essex when the Elizabeth line, currently under construction, opens.

A 2009 proposal to create a southern link with  via the Waterloo–Reading line was abandoned in 2011 due to lack of funding and difficulties with a high number of level crossings on the route into London, and a plan to link Heathrow to the planned High Speed 2 (HS2) railway line (with a new station) was also dropped from the HS2 plans in March 2015.

Among other schemes that have been considered is a rapid transport link between Heathrow and Gatwick Airports, known as Heathwick, which would allow the airports to operate jointly as an airline hub; In 2018, the Department for Transport began to invite proposals for privately funded rail links to Heathrow Airport. Projects being considered under this initiative include:
 HS4Air, a proposal for a new high-speed railway line which would link HS2 to the High Speed 1 line and the Channel Tunnel via a southern route, with stations at Heathrow and Gatwick Airports.

See also
Airports of London
Heathrow Worldwide Distribution Centre
List of airports in the United Kingdom and the British Crown Dependencies

Notes

References

Citations

Bibliography
 Cotton, Jonathan; Mills, John & Clegg, Gillian. (1986) Archaeology in West Middlesex. Uxbridge: London Borough of Hillingdon 
 Gallop, Alan. (2005) Time Flies: Heathrow at 60. Stroud: Sutton Publishing 
 Helpenny, Bruce B. (1992) Action Stations Vol.8: Military Airfields of Greater London. 
 Le Blond, Paul. (2018) Inside London's Airports Policy: Indecision, decision and counter-decision, ICE Publishing, 
 Sherwood, Philip. (1990) The History of Heathrow. Uxbridge: London Borough of Hillingdon 
 Sherwood, Philip (editor). (1993) The Villages of Harmondsworth. West Middlesex Family History Society, 
 Sherwood, Philip. (1999) Heathrow: 2000 Years of History. Stroud: Sutton Publishing 
 Sherwood, Philip. (2006) Around Heathrow Past & Present. Sutton Publishing 
 (Contains many pairs of photographs, old (or in one case a painting), and new, each pair made from the same viewpoint.)
 Sherwood, Philip. (2009) Heathrow: 2000 Years of History. Stroud: The History Press 
 Sherwood, Philip. (2012) Around Heathrow Through Time. Amberley Publishing, 
 Sherwood, Tim. (1999) Coming in to Land: A Short History of Hounslow, Hanworth and Heston Aerodromes 1911–1946. Heritage Publications (Hounslow Library) 
 Smith, Graham. (2003) Taking to the Skies: the Story of British Aviation 1903–1939. Countryside 
 Smith, Ron. (2002) British Built Aircraft Vol.1. Greater London: Tempus 
 Sturtivant, Ray. (1995) Fairey Aircraft: in Old Photographs. Alan Sutton 
 Taylor, H.A. (1974) Fairey Aircraft since 1915. Putnam .
 Taylor, John WR. (1997) Fairey Aviation: Archive Photographs. Chalford

External links

 
 Heathrow Community Engagement Board website

 
Airports in the London region
Airports established in 1946
Heathrow Airport Holdings
Buildings and structures in the London Borough of Hillingdon
Public inquiries in the United Kingdom
Transport in the London Borough of Hillingdon
Proposed transport infrastructure in London
Tourist attractions in the London Borough of Hillingdon
1946 establishments in England
Airports in England